Cyperus retrofractus is a species of sedge that is native to eastern parts of the United States.

See also 
 List of Cyperus species

References 

retrofractus
Plants described in 1843
Flora of Alabama
Flora of Arkansas
Flora of Delaware
Flora of Georgia (U.S. state)
Flora of Kentucky
Flora of Louisiana
Flora of Maryland
Flora of Missouri
Flora of New Jersey
Flora of North Carolina
Flora of Ohio
Flora of Pennsylvania
Flora of South Carolina
Flora of Tennessee
Flora of Virginia
Taxa named by John Torrey
Flora without expected TNC conservation status